A toddy shop is a drinking establishment seen in some parts of India (particularly Kerala) where palm toddy, a mildly alcoholic beverage made from the sap of palm trees, is served along with food.

The food served with toddy is very spicy and hot with chilies. The main dish is tapioca with red fish curry. There are some toddy shops which serve specific taste of toddy along with signature dishes.

See also
 Palm wine

References

External links
Photographs of a toddy shop from Niyasworld.blogspot.com

Alcohol in Kerala
Types of drinking establishment
Restaurants in India